Khanpur Assembly constituency may refer to 
 Khanpur, Rajasthan Assembly constituency
 Khanpur, Uttarakhand Assembly constituency